Attila Szekrényessy (20 January 1913 – 21 January 1995) was a Hungarian pair skater who competed with his sister Piroska Szekrényessy. He was born in Budapest, Hungary and died  in Gyöngyös. He and his sister were six-time gold medalists at the Hungarian Figure Skating Championships. The pair finished fourth at the 1936 Winter Olympics and won the bronze medal at the European Figure Skating Championships in 1936 and 1937.

Results
(with Piroska Szekrényessy)

References

External links
Attila Szekrényessy's profile at Sports Reference.com

1913 births
1995 deaths
Figure skaters from Budapest
Hungarian male pair skaters
Figure skaters at the 1936 Winter Olympics
Olympic figure skaters of Hungary
Olympic medalists in figure skating
European Figure Skating Championships medalists